Mount Torrens is a town in the eastern Adelaide Hills region of South Australia, 46 kilometres east-north-east of the state capital, Adelaide and 8 km east of Lobethal. It is located in the Adelaide Hills Council and the Mid Murray Council local government areas. At the 2006 census, Mount Torrens had a population of 337.

Etymology
The Indigenous name for the mount is unknown. The first Europeans to discover and ascend it, on 25 January 1838, were the exploration party of Dr. George Imlay and John Hill, but they did not name it. The mount (and nearby town) was named later after Robert Torrens, one of South Australia's founding fathers, as chairman of the South Australian Colonisation Commission, in likelihood because the Angas Creek which flows down the hill is a minor tributary of the Torrens River.

History
The town was developed by the Dunn family in the early 1840s. Then known as Barton Springs, it incorporated a farmhouse, smithy, stables and the Cornish Arms Inn. The town proper was laid out in 1853, and it served the Murray River trade at Mannum as well as a nearby copper mine. A small gold deposit was discovered in 1870, but by World War I, the town's importance had diminished, and the town that stands today is virtually unchanged since that time.

Facilities
Mount Torrens has a sporting ground, hotel, farm supply store and general store. There are three churches including the Lutheran church and former school at Spring Head, approximately 3 kilometers south. In 2019, Mount Torrens became part of the Adelaide Hills Sculpture Trail. The former site of the fire station was made into a small park which houses the sculpture. There is also a private school, Mount Torrens Christian School, and several historical buildings.

Mount Torrens was served by the Mount Pleasant railway line from 1918 to 1953. It is on Onkaparinga Valley Road (B34) between the towns of Charleston and Birdwood. Currently it is the eastern end of the Amy Gillett Bikeway which follows the former railway alignment from Oakbank. It may be extended in future to follow the rest of the railway route. It is served by the LinkSA coach route which runs from Mount Pleasant to Tea Tree Plaza.

Mount Torrens and the surrounding areas were damaged during the 2019 Cudlee Creek bushfire.

References 

Towns in South Australia